Malé Ozorovce is a village and municipality in the Trebišov District in the Košice Region of south-eastern Slovakia.

History
In historical records the village was first mentioned in 1332.

Geography
The village lies at an altitude of 197 metres (646 ft) and covers an area of 17.082 km² (4221 acres). It has a population of about 565 people.

Ethnicity
The village is almost 100% Slovak.

Facilities
The village has a public library and a football pitch.

External links
https://web.archive.org/web/20070513023228/http://www.statistics.sk/mosmis/eng/run.html

Villages and municipalities in Trebišov District
Zemplín (region)